Neocogniauxia monophylla is a species of orchid in the subfamily Epidendroideae. It grows in Jamaica from elevations of 3,300 to 5,300 ft.

References

Pleurothallidinae
Plants described in 1913